The Harper Encyclopedia of Military Biography was written by Trevor N. Dupuy, Curt Johnson and David Bongard, and was issued in 1992 by HarperCollins Publishers.  It contains more than three thousand short biographies of military figures from ancient times to 1990. Dennis E. Showalter, reviewing the work for the Library Journal said "the overall accuracy and perception of the biographical sketches earn this work a place in all collections on military history."

References

1992 non-fiction books
Encyclopedias of the military
Encyclopedias of history
Biographical dictionaries
20th-century encyclopedias